Alexander Sergeyevich Neverov, (24 December 1886 – 24 December 1923), was a Russian/Soviet writer and teacher. Neverov was his pseudonym; his real last name was Skobelev.

Biography
Neverov was born on 20 December 1886 in the village of Novikovka Melekess, Samara Province. His father was a farmer, a former non-commissioned officer of the Life Guard Lancers who later withdrew from the village and served as a doorman in the city. Neverov spent his childhood, until the age of 16, living in the home of his grandfather. This was due mostly to his father's military service.

He received his earliest education at a local church school. In 1903 he was accepted at a secondary school in Ozerkino. He graduated after three years of study with a diploma which gave him the qualifications of an elementary school teacher. In his third year in Ozerkino he published his first story in The Temperance Messenger, a St Petersburg newspaper.

After 1906, Neverov worked as a rural teacher, while at the same time publishing stories in magazines.  He married in 1912. In 1915 he spent time as a nurse in Samara. During the Revolution he became friendly with members of the Socialist Revolutionary Party, but in 1919 joined the Bolsheviks, and held significant positions in various institutions of Samara. He was one of the founders of the local folk theater, and in 1919 he wrote his first plays, one of which, "Baba", won first place in a contest in Moscow.

During the famine years of 1920-1921, together with a mass of hungry people, he fled from the Volga Region into Tashkent. In the fall of 1921, after the death of one of his three children, he conceived a plan of moving to Moscow. He travelled first to Tashkent in order to obtain food for his family. This harrowing journey was the inspiration for his novel City of Bread. In spring of 1922 he moved to Moscow where he joined the group "The Forge". He affiliated himself with a number of revolutionary periodicals, wrote short stories, published his earlier stories in book form, and began work on a novel, Story of Women, which he never finished.

Neverov died suddenly of heart failure on 24 December 1923 in Moscow. He was buried at the Vagankovo Cemetery.

His complete works, released in 1926, were reprinted five times before 1930.

"Taschkent, die brotreiche Stadt", the German translation of City of Bread, was burned by Nazis during the extensive Nazi book burnings in 1933.

English translations
Tashkent, (novel), Victor Gollancz, London, 1930. Translated from the Russian by Reginald Merton and W.G. Walton
City of Bread, (novel), George H. Doran Co, 1927. (Reprinted by Hyperion Press, 1973.)
The Music and On the Land, (stories), from The Salt Pit, Raduga Publishers, Moscow, 1988.
Hunger, (story), from Tellers of Tales, Doubleday, Doran & Company, New York, 1939.

Notes

1886 births
1923 deaths
Russian male novelists
Russian dramatists and playwrights
Russian male dramatists and playwrights
Russian male short story writers
Russian educators
Soviet novelists
Soviet male writers
20th-century male writers
Soviet dramatists and playwrights
Soviet short story writers
20th-century Russian short story writers
Bolsheviks
Burials at Vagankovo Cemetery
19th-century pseudonymous writers
20th-century pseudonymous writers